Ahmad Nasser Eid Abdullah Al-Fajri Al-Azimi, also, Abu Omar Al-Kuwaiti and Abu Zaid (1972 – 16 February 2005) was a Kuwaiti and suspected al-Qaeda agent operating first in Afghanistan and later in Chechnya and the wider Caucasus area.

Biography
Abu Zaid worked as a Kuwaiti actor in children TV programs, until he turned to religion and started working as an Imam at the Safwan Bin Omayah Mosque of Kuwait City, though he was soon sacked for illegally collecting donations from the mosque goers. In 1998 he first went to Afghanistan where he was reportedly trained at the al-Qaeda Al Farouq training camp, and then in October 1999 on to Chechnya. He was accused by the Russian government of numerous terrorist attacks, including involvement in organizing the Beslan school hostage crisis.

On 16 February 2005, Abu Zaid died after having been surrounded by Russian special forces in his safehouse in Ingushetia. He was married to a Chechen wife, with whom he had two surviving sons.

References

1972 births
2005 deaths
Beslan school siege
Foreign volunteers in Chechnya
Kuwaiti al-Qaeda members
Suicides in Russia